Arnay is a village in the Sanchor tehsil of the Jalore district, Rajasthan, India. Arnay is situated 18 km from tehsil headquarters. Agriculture is the main occupation of this village. The population of this village is around 6,000–6,500. This village has an average literacy rate of 52%; male literacy is 65% and female literacy is 38%.

Distances 
National Highway 67 of India passes 15 kilometers from this village. The nearest railway station is Bhinmal, which is 40 kilometers away. Block headquarters are connected by bus service.

Schools 

 Adarsh Govt. Sr. Sec. School 
 G.G.U.P.S. Sanskrit School
 G.U.P.S. SUTHARON KA GOLIYA School 
 G.U.P.S. ARNAYA KA GOLIYA School 
 G.P.S. CHATURANIYO KI DHANI 
 G.P.S. PARBHUANIYON KI DHANI 
 G.P.S. PARMARO KI DHANI ARNAY 
 G.P.S. PRATAPANIYO & AMLUANIYO KI DHANI 
 G.P.S. REBARIYON KA GOLIYA 
 G.P.S. REBARIYON KI DHANI CHAR RASTA 
 Pratap Public School

External links 
 Census 2011

Villages in Jalore district